Eungbongsan (Seoul) is a mountain in Eungbong-dong, Seongdong-gu, South Korea, bordering the Han River. It has an elevation of 81 metres. There is a traditional eight-sided pagoda at the top of the mountain with panoramic views of Seoul Capital Area including Gyeonggi Province.

History
The mountain is located between Eungbong-dong and Geumho-dong and earns its name due to the king in the Joseon Dynasty hunting on this mountain with a falcon (Mae in Korean, earning name Maebong), which is Eungbong in Hanja.

Summary
On the way to the top, there is a public recreation area with a playground, rock climbing wall, and a swaying bridge. The mountain is also popular in the spring due to the yellow flowers on the way to the top.

On the top, there is a traditional eight sided pagoda with cultural information and views of the Han River, Seoul, Seoul Forest, Namsan, and Cheonggyesan. As the mountain is at the intersection of the Han River and Jungnangcheon, migratory birds can also be seen.

The mountain is one of the most popular places for photographers to take photos of Seoul, due to its panoramic views of the city, especially at night, combined with its accessibility.

See also
 Eungbong-dong
List of mountains of Korea

References

Mountains of Seoul
Seongdong District